Zoran Popovich (February 4, 1931 – March 20, 2018) was a judge on the Pennsylvania Superior Court. Popovich was appointed to the court in 1980, and was then elected to a full ten-year term in 1985 and again in 1995. He served until his retirement in 2001 and stayed as a part-time judge until 2010.

Born in Akron, Ohio, Popovich was in the United States Air Force from 1951 to 1953. He received a Bachelor of Arts from the University of Pittsburgh in 1954, and a Bachelor of Laws from the University of Pittsburgh Law School in 1957. He was elected to the Court of Common Pleas of Allegheny County, 1973. He died on March 20, 2018, aged 87.

References

External links
 
 Official biography of Zoran Popovich
 List of judges of the Pennsylvania Superior Court

Notes
 Material on this page was initially imported from the Judgepedia article on Zoran Popovich, and has been expressly released under the GFDL per Judgepedia:Copyrights..

1931 births
2018 deaths
20th-century American judges
20th-century American lawyers
American people of Serbian descent
Judges of the Pennsylvania Courts of Common Pleas
Judges of the Superior Court of Pennsylvania
People from Akron, Ohio
United States Air Force officers
University of Pittsburgh School of Law alumni
University of Pittsburgh alumni